Cetinje is a town in Montenegro. It is the former royal capital (prijestonica / приjестоница) of Montenegro and is the location of several national institutions, including the official residence of the president of Montenegro. According to the 2011 census, the town had a population of 14,093 while the Cetinje Municipality had 16,657 residents . Cetinje is the centre of Cetinje Municipality. The city rests on a small karst plain surrounded by limestone mountains, including Mount Lovćen, the legendary mountain in Montenegrin historiography. Cetinje was founded in the 15th century and became a cradle of the culture of Montenegro. Its status as the honorary capital of Montenegro is due to its heritage as a long-serving former capital of Montenegro.

Name
In Montenegrin, Bosnian, Croatian, and Serbian, it is known as Cetinje (archaically Цетинѣ / Cetině); in Italian as Cettigne; in Greek as Κετίγνη (Ketígni); in Turkish as Çetine; and in Albanian as Cetina.

According to the written data, by the end of the XVII century, down the plain flowed the River Cetina, so that part of the town was called by that river Cetinjsko polje (The field of Cetinje). In Cetinjsko polje, at that time there used to be a small inhabited village, by which the later newly created town got name Cetinje. In the historical documents, Cetinje is mentioned for the first time in 1440.

History

Founding

Cetinje was founded in 1482, when Ivan Crnojević moved his capital from Obod above the Crnojević River to deeper into the hills to a more easily defended location in a field at the foot of Mount Lovćen. He had his court built at the new location that year and also founded a monastery (dedicated to the Mother of Christ) as a personal endowment in 1484. His court and the monastery are the first recorded renaissance buildings in Montenegro. Crnojević was forced to move the seat of the Eparchy of Zeta from Vranjina to Cetinje due to the Ottoman invasions, in 1485. The town was named after the Cetina river.

The bishopric of Zeta was elevated to a metropolitanate in Cetinje. It was later to play an important part in both the religious and national life. The Crnojević printing house, the first printing house in southeastern Europe, was active between 1493 and 1496 in Cetinje. Zeta was first put under Ottoman rule in 1499, then annexed by the Ottomans in 1514, organized into the Sanjak of Montenegro.

Early modern period
In the next two centuries, the development of Cetinje stagnated. It was very often subject to attack by Venice and the Ottomans. The city therefore endured many privations in the course of the 16th and 17th centuries. 

During this period the court and the monastery of the Crnojevići dynasty were destroyed. It was only at the end of the 17th century, in 1697, that Cetinje began to flourish again under the rule of the Petrović dynasty, refounded by Danilo Petrović.

Modern period

Leading the wars of liberation and strengthening the unity in the country occupied Danilo and his successors, so they were unable to devote enough effort to the further development of Cetinje. It was only during the rule of Petar II Petrović Njegoš that far greater progress was made. In 1838 his new royal residence called Biljarda (Billiard house) was built. Cetinje was enlarged by building new houses that gradually led to genuine urbanization.

Many modern buildings designed for foreign consulates were built due to the newly established relations with various European countries, including the French, Russian, British, Italian and Austro-Hungarian consulates.

Cetinje made great progress under the rule of Prince Nikola I Petrović when numerous public edifices were built. Those include the first hotel, called ‘Lokanda’, then the new Prince's palace, the Girls’ Institute and the hospital. This period also saw the first tenancy houses. In the 1860 census Cetinje had 34 households. After initially holding off Ottoman incursions in 1852 and 1853, Cetinje was captured by Ottoman Omar Pasha's forces during the Montenegrin–Ottoman War of 1861–62. Ottoman rule over Montenegro did not last much more than a decade however, as 14 years later the "Great War", the third successive contest between the two nations, ended in Montenegrin victory, with most previously-Montenegrin territory returning to their control.

Montenegrin independence was recognized at the Congress of Berlin of 1878 and consequently Cetinje became the capital of a European country. Between 1878 and 1914 Cetinje flourished in every sense. Many renowned intellectuals from other South-Slavic parts came to stay there and made a contribution to the cultural, educational and every other aspect of life. Montenegro was proclaimed a kingdom in 1910. This had a great effect on Cetinje's development. At this time the Government House, the symbol of state power, was built. The population census from the same year recorded a massive growth in the world's smallest capital, registering 5,895 inhabitants.

In the Interwar period, Cetinje expanded its territory, as it was now a centre of the Zeta region. But when it was decided by the Parliament of Montenegro that the administrative organs should be located in Titograd (previously and presently Podgorica),  Cetinje went through a harsh crisis. By building certain industrial sections and at the same time neglecting the development of the city's traditional and potential cultural and tourist capacities, the chance to create a strong basis for more solid prosperity was lost.

When Communist forces captured Cetinje in November 1944 the only population that stayed in the town were people who believed they have no reason to fear or hide from anybody. Still, as soon as Communists captured Cetinje, in the night of 13 November 1944, they shot without any trial 28 citizens of Cetinje. They were all summarily executed at "New Cemetery" of Cetinje in Humci.

On 12 August 2022, a mass shooting occurred in Cetinje, in which eleven people died, including the perpetrator, and six others were injured. It is Montenegro's deadliest mass shooting.

Administration 
Cetinje is governed by mayor and the Old Royal Capital Government. Since December 2021, the mayor of Old Royal Capital Cetinje is Nikola Đurašković (SDP).

National institutions 
Although Podgorica is the capital of Montenegro, Cetinje is the seat of numerous national institutions of Montenegro. The official residence of the president of Montenegro is in Cetinje, called the Blue Palace owing to the colour of its walls. Cetinje is the seat of Montenegrin, National Museum of Montenegro, National library and State archives.

Administrative and operational bodies 
Administrative and operational bodies of local administration are secretaries, administrations, directorates, managements and services. There are six secretariats in the Old Royal Capital Cetinje: The Secretariat for Local Government, The Secretariat of Finance and Enterprise Development, The Secretariat of Spatial Planning and Environment Protection,  The Secretariat for Utilities and Transport, The Secretariat for Culture and Sport and The Secretariat for Social Affairs and Youth. Other administrative bodies are Management of public revenue, Directorate for Property, Directorate of Investment and Development and Center for Information System. Operational bodies are Mayor's Service, Service of Chief Administrator, The City Manager's Service, Public relations Bureau, Common Affairs Service, Protection service and Communal Police.

City Parliament 
Skupština Prijestonice Cetinje is the Parliament of Old Royal Capital Cetinje. Local parliament is made up of 33 deputies, or odbornici (councillors) in Montenegrin. It is elected by universal ballot and is presided over by a speaker called the Predsjednik Skupštine (President of Parliament).

Local subdivisions 

There are two city settlements in the Old Royal Capital – Cetinje and Rijeka Crnojevića.

Old Royal Capital Cetinje is divided into 23 local community bodies (mjesne zajednice) in which the citizens participate in decisions on matters of relevance to the local community.

Settlements 
The prijestonica of Cetinje is divided into two urban settlements: Cetinje and Rijeka Crnojevića, and 92 rural settlements: Bajice, Barjamovica, Bijele Poljane, Bjeloši, Bobija, Boguti, Bokovo, Češljari, Čevo, Dide, Dobrska Župa, Dobrsko Selo, Dodoši, Donja Zaljut, Donje Selo, Dragomi Do, Drušići, Dubovik, Dubovo, Dugi Do, Dujeva, Đalci, Đinovići, Erakovići, Gađi, Gornja Zaljut, Gornji Ceklin, Grab, Gradina, Građani, Izvori, Jankovići, Jezer, Kobilji Do, Kopito, Kosijeri, Kranji Do, Kućišta, Lastva, Lipa, Lješev Stub, Majstori, Malošin Do, Markovina, Meterizi, Mikulići, Milijevići, Mužovići, Njeguši, Obzovica, Očinići, Oćevići, Ožegovice, Pačarađe, Pejovići, Petrov Do, Poda, Podbukovica, Prediš, Prekornica, Prentin Do, Prevlaka, Proseni Do, Radomir, Raičevići, Resna, Riječani, Rokoči, Rvaši, Ržani Do, Smokovci, Šinđon, Štitari, Tomići, Trešnjevo, Trnjine, Uba, Ubli, Ublice, Ugnji, Ulići, Velestovo, Vignjevići, Vojkovići, Vrba, Vrela, Vuči Do, Zabrđe, Začir, Zagora, Žabljak Crnojevića and Žanjev Do.

Geography 
Now, it is on the main road Podgorica-Cetinje-Budva, which makes it open to the inside of Montenegro and Montenegrin coast.

Climate 
Cetinje has an oceanic climate (Köppen climate classification: Cfb), with relatively dry and warm summers, and mild and wet winters.

Although abundant in precipitation, the Cetinje field and its surroundings do not have water flows on the surface and water sources are scarce. This is a consequence of the karst configuration and its geologic structure.

Demographics 
Cetinje is the administrative centre of Cetinje Municipality, which has a population of 18,482.

According to the census of population, households and apartments in 2011, in the territory of The Old Royal Capital Cetinje live 16,757 inhabitants, or 2.7% of the population of Montenegro. In the town of Cetinje live 13.991 inhabitants. According to the number of inhabitants, Cetinje is one of the medium units of local government in Montenegro.

Ethnicity

Language

Religion
Source: Statistical Office of Montenegro - MONSTAT, Census 2011

Economy

Public works 

After the decades of stagnation, the new city government began a lot of projects with the intention to revitalise the infrastructure, business and to gain a higher promotion of Cetinje in cultural, touristic and other parts. Some of that projects were the reconstruction of Cetinje Historical Core (Main Street – Njegoševa, Main Town Square, Students' Square), Beautiful Cetinje (first energy-efficiency project in Montenegro), reconstruction of the City Market, valorisation of Lipa Cave, renovation of the first hospital building in Montenegro, building a completely new utilities system, construction of a new main road at the entrance to the town, the largest fine arts university complex in the region etc. During the past period, Cetinje became first Montenegrin city which is covered by the free wi-fi signal.

Promotion 
To promote Cetinje as not only cultural and artist capital of Montenegro but the whole region too, during 2012 and 2013 the city government organized events in which participated globally famous artists such as Pierce Brosnan, Marina Abramović, Gerard Depardieu, Nicholas Lyndhurst and Rem Koolhaas, who were guests of Cetinje during that period.

The most significant project for the future is a cable-car from Kotor to Cetinje, and tender was launched in August 2016.

Transport 
Cetinje is connected to Podgorica and Budva through three-lane motorways. Another road to Podgorica is built on the coast of Skadar lake.

There is also a historic old road from Cetinje to Kotor, which is not of premium quality, but which overlooks the Bay of Kotor. As of Spring 2018, this was being upgraded.

Previously there was a railway line from Cetinje to Bar along the banks of Lake Skadar, which transported both passengers and cargo. There are no remains of this railway line.

Culture 

Cetinje has been the cultural and educational centre of Montenegro for five centuries. There are five republic institutions: Đurđe Crnojević Central National Library, the National Museum of Montenegro, the Archives of Montenegro, the Republic Institute for Preserving Cultural Heritage and the Zetski Dom Montenegrin Royal National Theatre. All these institutions keep, process, and provide public access to enormous literary treasure, and protect both mobile and immobile cultural monuments throughout Montenegro. The oldest – and for a long time the most important – cultural institution in the town is the monastery of Cetinje.

Architecture and urban heritage 

The onset and development of Cetinje, as a relatively young city, with its old historical core draws a lot of attention to urban and architectural heritage, on its construction and development influenced stormy historical, social and economic events in the country.

Cetinje, as a settlement has existed for 500 years, which is not much compared to the development of the coastal agglomeration of the ancient period in the immediate surrounding. However, these five centuries – the whole history of a people, who, through the development of city recorded moments of their origin, ascent, stagnation and downs.

For Cetinje as urban agglomeration, can be said to have formed suddenly, which makes it very specific. In fact, since the seventies of the nineteenth century, for almost fifty years, there was, in the urban context, designed and typological characteristic areas formed with urban type residential home ground floor and storey house with developed attic, created and developed in closed urban blocks, where line of life in them was street – house – garden.

Along with the development of this type of urban city blocks and residential buildings, has developed substantial public architecture of the city, which was built under the great influence of foreign builders with the application of various architectural styles and which then and now, is a representative architectural backbone of the city.

Between the two world wars, which characterized by the loss of Montenegrin statehood and noticeable stagnation of the architectural development of the city, Cetinje continues the tradition of formed, then already traditional type of urban residential houses and closed urban blocks, but they build the first modern multi-storey residential buildings for collective housing, and modern public institutions necessary for the then social life.

In the fastest and most important period of the development of Cetinje, since the seventies of the nineteenth century until the First World War, which was then the smallest European old capital, was created and developed city on the principles the European metropolises of that time in whose architectural activity of the city was engaged many foreign architects, engineers, builders and craftsmen.

The development of Cetinje in this period was followed by many important historical and social events. So the second half of the nineteenth century in the development of Cetinje marked period of state power and its pursuit of the European culture and international recognition. Recognition of Montenegro as an independent state, at the Berlin Congress in 1878., on the basis of which greatly expanded, he began a period of rapid creation of a national, economic, social, cultural, societal and spatial superstructure which caused increasing of economic power and the reorganization and improvement of the state apparatus and the authorities. During this period, Cetinje, as the old royal capital, gains in an even greater national and international significance and experiencing its rapid socio – economic, institutional, and urban development.

Without taking into consideration possibility and efforts which Cetinje is realized as spatially small and young city, it occupies an important place in terms of conceptual, social and urban transformation of other cities in Montenegro, particularly since the second half of the nineteenth century until the First World War.

On the basis of that and the facts about today's relatively preserved old urban heritage, is justified the fact which Cetinje ranks among the cities with significant architectural heritage.

Printing houses in Cetinje 

Cetinje has a rich publishing and printing tradition. The Printing House of Crnojevići (1492–1496) and the books published there are of great importance for Montenegrin culture and history as well as for the culture of other Orthodox Balkan peoples. Its greatest contribution refers to spreading Cyrillic type. Thus, it represents an important link in a chain of world culture. There were a number of printing houses that continued this great printing tradition. These are: Njegoš Printing House, which operated between 1833 and 1839 and the State Printing House which was founded in 1858. It was renamed in 1952. Since then it has been known as Obod.

Since their foundation to the present day, Cetinje printing houses have published over 3,000 books, a major contribution to the Montenegrin cultural heritage. The first Montenegrin literary and scientific annual, Grlica (Turtledove), was published in 1835, while the first Montenegrin newspaper, ‘The Montenegrin’, was established in 1871. Since then, sixty different newspapers and over thirty magazines have been published. In 1914, as a town of fewer than 6,000 inhabitants, Cetinje supported six different daily newspapers.

Libraries 

The oldest libraries of Montenegro, where the oldest books and documentation of great value are preserved, are located at Cetinje. This makes Cetinje internationally recognized as well. The oldest library among these is the Library of Cetinje Monastery, which was founded by the end of the 15th century at the time when the Printing House of Crnojevići started operating. Today, seventy-five old manuscripts written in Cyrillic, then four incunabula, and many old liturgical books are kept there.

The first public reading room in Montenegro known as The Reading Room of Cetinje was founded in 1896. Since its founding it has been the cultural centre of Montenegro. The fruitful activity of this reading room was continued by the Town Library and the Njegoš reading room, which offers over 63,000 books and volumes of periodicals.

The school libraries of Cetinje also have a long tradition. The library of the oldest school at Cetinje today known as Njegoš Elementary School dates back to 1834, the library of the clerical college and the Carica Marija Girls’ Institute dates back to 1869, and the library of the Gymnasium to 1880.

Museums 

Museums in Cetinje include:

 Museum of the Cetinje Monastery
 State Museum
 "Petar Petrovic Njegoš" Museum
 Ethnographic Museum
 Electric Industry Museum
 History Museum
 Art Museum

All these except the Museum of the Cetinje Monastery and Electric Industry Museum are integrated in one institution called the National Museum of Montenegro. Numerous museums and the huge fund of museum items that are kept there established Cetinje's reputation as a museum town.

Cetinje has always been a cultural centre. Every second year the international art exhibition called Cetinje Biennial is held there. Its founder is Prince Nikola Petrović, great-grandson to King Nikola I.

Main sights 
Cetinje has a number of attractions, including Cetinje Monastery, Vlaška church (built in 1450, with its fence made out of barrels of captured enemy rifles), Biljarda, several museums, Zetski dom royal theatre and historic foreign embassies. Many of the old embassies and other administrative buildings are now schools of various kinds, and the town has many young people.

Close to Cetinje (about ) the Lipa cave (Lipska pecina) is situated, one of the biggest caves in the former Yugoslavia. Its entrance is located in the village of Lipa and it ends in the mountains directly over the Adriatic Sea. After project of Municipality of Cetinje and company 'Lipa Cave', the cave is restored and opened for public in July 2015. Today the cave is one of the biggest tourist attractions in Cetinje and Montenegro, similar to Postojna Cave in Slovenia.

One of the most visited destinations of Cetinje is the mausoleum of Petar II Petrović-Njegoš on the mountain Lovćen. Apart from the surrounding natural environment of beech, oak and linden tree forests, there is a unique freshness of Lovćen national park.

In the past few years there has been a plan of enlisting the old historic core of the city of Cetinje as a UNESCO world heritage site. With this, Cetinje hopes to rebuild and restore the old historic core and the façades of its buildings. Cetinje is becoming more and more popular with tourists so the locals started painting their houses in vivid colors, the local government started quite a number of projects to restore the buildings, the markets and façades of the city of Cetinje.

Religion 

Cetinje is also the seat of the Eparchy of Montenegro and the Littoral of the Serbian Orthodox Church, and Montenegrin Orthodox Church.

Seat of the Eparchy of Montenegro and the Littoral is situated in Cetinje Monastery. Seat of the Montenegrin Orthodox Church is situated in the Chapel in Gruda quarter.

Festivals 
Today, Cetinje is home of one of the most popular cultural events in Montenegro – 'Summer at the Old Royal Capital'. It is the artist festival with almost 100 events, which held yearly, from June to September. During that period, visitors can attend the gigs of regional artist stars at the most significant city locations, but in the villages too. During the 'Summer at the Old Royal Capital', there are festivals like 'Royal Fest' (hard rock, alternative), 'Cetinje Jazz Fest', 'Espressivo' (classical music), 'Cucka jeka' (Kobilji Do), 'Riječka noć' (Rijeka Crnojevića), 'Njeguško ljeto' (Lovćen and Njeguši), 'Folklor' etc. Events during the 'Summer at the Old Royal Capital' attend about 50,000 visitors.

There are more festivals and events during the whole year, like 'Christmas Concerts' (7/8 January), Independence Day event (21 May), 'MIT Fest' (alternative theatre festival) etc.

Sport
The most popular sports in Cetinje are football, handball and basketball.

Football
Football in Cetinje has a very long tradition associated with FK Lovćen Cetinje, oldest football club in Montenegro. FK Lovćen was founded on 20 June 1913. It is one of the most successful football clubs in Montenegro.

The best results in the past were achieved before WW2, when they won few Montenegrin Championships, and in 1956 in qualifications for the first national league. In 1947, Lovćen was juvenile club champion. FK Lovćen now competes in the Montenegrin First League. During the season 2013/14, Lovćen won second place. On 21 May 2014, Lovćen won the Montenegrin Cup, which was the first national trophy in the club's history.

Another club from Cetinje is FK Cetinje, formed in 1975. They play in the Montenegrin Third League and share the Stadion Sveti Petar Cetinjski with Lovćen.

Handball
Formed at 1949, Handball club “Lovćen” is among oldest handball clubs in Montenegro. During the decades, especially from 80's until today, Lovćen became most successful Montenegrin men's handball club, but the most trophied team from Old Royal Capital Cetinje. There is huge number of great Montenegrin, Yugoslav and European players which produced handball school of Lovćen.

From the 1988 until today, Lovćen played 23 seasons in the First Handball League of SFR Yugoslavia, FR Yugoslavia and Montenegro. Five times, club from Cetinje won the champions' title – in the seasons 1999/00, 2000/01, 2006/07, 2011/12 and 2012/13.

Most trophies in the club history, Lovćen won in the national Cup. Club from Cetinje holds 2 winner titles in the Cup of FR Yugoslavia and five in the Montenegrin Cup. Lovćen hold Cup trophies from the seasons 2001/02, 2002/03, 2008/09, 2009/10, 2010/11, 2011/12, 2012/13.

Lovćen is member of Regional SEHA League since its inception. Today, Lovćen is the only SEHA League member from Montenegro. In their first SEHA League season, Lovćen made surprising result, with final placement on 6th position. Year after that, Lovćen finished season on the same table position. In the season 2013/14, because of new SEHA League criteria, SRC Lovćen hall was reconstructed, with changing capacity from 1,500 to 2,020.

Handball club Lovćen is permanent member of European handball competitions since 1997. The greatest result Lovćen made during the EHF Champions League 2000/01 when they participated in the quarterfinals against THW Kiel. Until today, Lovćen played 65 games in European Competitions.

"B" team of Lovćen is HC Cepelin-Lovćen, which in past competed in First league. Today, Cepelin-Lovćen is playing in Second league.

Basketball
Basketball club Lovćen is one of the oldest sport clubs in Cetinje. It was founded in 1947. The best results were achieved in 1997/98 season, when it was scored at the 6th place of the National basketball league. This provided participation at international competition “Radivoje Korac Cup.”
Today, it competes in the first A league of Montenegro. 
Second club is BC Cetinje, formed in 1997.

Other sports
During the past, in Cetinje existed Volleyball club "Lovćen". It competed in Republic League and was among best Montenegrin clubs in that sport. VC "Lovćen" is not active anymore.

Today, there are dozens of active clubs. Table-tennis club "Lovćen" is among two most successful table tennis clubs in Montenegro during last four decades. Other clubs are Racing team "Lovćen", Judo club "Crnogorac", Karate club "Lovćen", Boxing club "Lovćen", Women basketball club "Lovćen" and others.

Venues
Cetinje has a number of sporting venues. The main sporting venues on Cetinje are:

 Stadion Sveti Petar Cetinjski, with capacity of 5,192 seats.
 Sports Center Cetinje, a multi functional indoor sport facility. It has a capacity of 2,020 seats.
 New small football field of FK Lovćen, with capacity of 1,000 seats with lights for night games.

Main sights 

Cetinje has a number of attractions, including Cetinje Monastery, Vlaška church (built in 1450, with its fence made out of barrels of captured enemy rifles), Biljarda, several museums, Zetski dom royal theatre, and historic foreign embassies. Many of the old embassies and other administrative buildings are now schools of various kinds, and the town has many young people.

Close to Cetinje (about ) the Lipa cave (Lipska pecina) is situated, one of the biggest caves in the former Yugoslavia. Its entrance is located in the village of Lipa and it ends in the mountains directly over the Adriatic Sea. After project of Municipality of Cetinje and company 'Lipa Cave', the cave is restored and opened for public in July 2015. Today the cave is one of the biggest tourist attractions in Cetinje and Montenegro, similar to Postojna Cave in Slovenia.

One of the most visited destinations of Cetinje is the mausoleum of Petar II Petrović-Njegoš on the mountain Lovćen. Apart from the surrounding natural environment of beech, oak and linden tree forests, there is a unique freshness of Lovćen national park.

Notable people 

 Ivan Crnojević – Lord of Zeta and the founder of Cetinje
 Đurađ Crnojević – last Montenegrin medieval Lord of Zeta
 Arsenije III Čarnojević, Patriarch of Peć
 Danilo I Petrović-Njegoš – Metropolitan of Cetinje and the founder of the House of Petrović-Njegoš
 Sava Petrović – Prince-Bishopric of Montenegro
 Arsenije Plamenac – Metropolitan of Cetinje
 Petar I Petrović-Njegoš – Prince-Bishopric of Montenegro
 Petar II Petrović-Njegoš – Prince-Bishop of Montenegro, poet and philosopher
 Prince Danilo I – Prince of Montenegro
 Nikola I Petrović-Njegoš – King of Montenegro
 Milena of Montenegro – Queen of Montenegro
 Elena of Montenegro, Queen of Italy
 Princess Milica of Montenegro
 Princess Anastasia of Montenegro
 Danilo II, Crown Prince of Montenegro
 Princess Anna of Montenegro
 Prince Mirko of Montenegro
 Princess Zorka of Montenegro
 Princess Xenia of Montenegro
 Princess Vjera of Montenegro
 Mirko Petrović-Njegoš – was a Montenegrin military commander, politician and poet
 Krsto Zrnov Popovic, officer of the Montenegrin Army 
 George, Crown Prince of Serbia
 Alexander I of Yugoslavia
 Branko Kostić – Yugoslav politician, businessman, university professor
 Dado, painter
 Petar Lubarda, painter
 Milo Milunović, painter
 Dimitrije Popović, painter, sculptor, philosopher
 Miloš Vušković, painter, illustrator and caricaturist
 Dragoljub Đuričić, percussionist
 Žarko Laušević, actor
 Frédéric Rossif – French film and television director
 Slavko Perović, politician
 Miodrag Perunović, boxer, European amateur champion
 Goran Vujević, Yugoslav volleyball player and Olympic champion
 Milutin Pajević, former football player and manager
 Nikola Jovanović, former football player
 Mirko Stojanović, former football player
 Veselin Vujović, former handball player
 Vuko Borozan, handball player, National Team Montenegro, Vardar
 Veselin Vujović, former handball player, Olympic and World champion, IHF World Player of the Year
 Veljko Uskoković, water polo player, Olympic bronze medalist and European champion
 Žarko Marković, handball player 
 Draško Mrvaljević, handball player
 Aleksandar Bogdanović – politician
 Petar Kapisoda, handball player
 Filip Kapisoda, male model and celebrity
 Milica Dabović, basketball player, Olympic bronze medalist and European champion
 Miloš Karadaglić – classical guitarist
 Ana Dabović, basketball player, Olympic bronze medalist and European champion
 Miloš Nikić, volleyball player and European champion
 Danka Kovinić – tennis player
 Marija Vuković - athlete specializing in the high jump

International relations

Twin towns – sister cities
Cetinje is twinned with:

 Alba Iulia, Romania
 Gaeta, Italy
 Gaziantep, Turkey
 Dijon, France
 Dubrovnik, Croatia
 Kharkiv, Ukraine
 Kostroma, Russia
 Larnaca, Cyprus
 Mali Iđoš, Serbia
 Maribor, Slovenia
 Nafplio, Greece
 Novo Sarajevo (Sarajevo), Bosnia and Herzegovina
 Nürnberg, Germany
 Rijeka, Croatia
 Santa Severina, Italy
 Shkodër, Albania
 Sinaia, Romania
 Split, Croatia
 Spoleto, Italy
 Velika Kladuša, Bosnia and Herzegovina
 Veliko Tarnovo, Bulgaria
 Visegrád, Hungary
 Vranje, Serbia
 West Achaea, Greece
 Siena, Italy

See also 
 List of former national capitals

References

Citations

Bibliography

External links 

 

 
Cetinje Municipality
Former national capitals
Populated places in Cetinje Municipality
1482 establishments in Europe
Populated places established in the 1480s
2nd-millennium establishments in Montenegro
Former capitals of Montenegro